is a railway station on the Tsugaru Railway Line in the city of Goshogawara, Aomori, Japan, operated by the private railway operator Tsugaru Railway Company.

Lines

Station layout
The station has a single side platform serving a bidirectional track. The station is unattended.

History
Tsugaru-Iizume Station was opened on July 15, 1930. It has been unattended since 2004.

Surrounding area
Iizume Post Office
Goshogawara No.4 Junior High School

See also
 List of railway stations in Japan

External links

 

Railway stations in Aomori Prefecture
Tsugaru Railway Line
Goshogawara
Railway stations in Japan opened in 1930